Jure Pelivan (1 December 1928 – 18 July 2014) was a Bosnian Croat politician and economist. He served as the last Prime Minister of the Socialist Republic of Bosnia and Herzegovina from 20 December 1990 until 3 March 1992, during the end of the Yugoslav era. He then served as the first Prime Minister of the independent Republic of Bosnia and Herzegovina from 3 March 1992 to 9 November 1992. An ethnic Croat, Pelivan was a member of the Croatian Democratic Union of Bosnia and Herzegovina (HDZ BiH).

Pelivan, an economist, served as a board member of the Central Bank of Bosnia and Herzegovina for eight years following the end of the Bosnian War.

He moved to neighboring Split in Croatia, in 2007, where he resided for the remainder of his life. Pelivan died in Split on 18 July 2014, at the age of 85.

References

1928 births
2014 deaths
People from Livno
Croats of Bosnia and Herzegovina
Croatian Democratic Union of Bosnia and Herzegovina politicians
Bosnia and Herzegovina economists
Burials at Lovrinac Cemetery